The EFL Trophy is a knockout cup competition in English football organised by and named after the English Football League. The competition was first played in 1983–84. It is open to the 48 members of the Football League bottom two divisions, League One and League Two. Until 2015–16, the competition was split into North and South sections, with the winners of each section meeting in the finals (in recent years, only the earlier rounds have been split into sections). On several occasions, leading teams from the next division down in the English football league system, the National League, have been admitted into the competition but have never won the title. For the 2016–17 season, 16 category 1 Premier League and Championship academy/under-21 sides were allowed to participate. The final was held at the home stadium of Hull City in 1984, before it switched to Wembley Stadium in 1985. It was played at the Millennium Stadium in Cardiff from 2001 while Wembley was rebuilt, before returning to the new Wembley in 2008.

Finals

Key

* Note: 2020 final was played in 2021.

Results by team
Teams in bold compete outside EFL Leagues One and Two as of 2022–23 season and thus do not compete in the EFL Trophy (some Premier League and Championship teams may enter their reserve/academic/youth teams, but none has made a final so far and a win by any such team will not count as a full-team club record).

References
General
Football League Trophy results page

Specific

External links
Official website

finals
 
EFL Trophy
EFL Trophy